Charlbury railway station is a railway station serving the town of Charlbury in Oxfordshire, England.  This station and all trains serving it are operated by Great Western Railway.  After almost 40 years as a single-platform station, the track through Charlbury station was redoubled with the recommissioning of a second platform on 6 June 2011 as part of the project to improve reliability and increase traffic capacity on the Cotswold Line.

History

The Oxford, Worcester and Wolverhampton Railway opened the station in 1853. It is notable for the original station building, a wooden chalet-type structure in the Italianate architectural style of Isambard Kingdom Brunel; together with the early station nameboard this is a Grade II listed building restored in 1979. Until 1970 the station had a goods shed, a 30 cwt crane and a 34-lever signal box. The signal box was demolished when the line through the station was singled on 29 November 1971.

Sir Peter Parker (1924–2002), the former Chairman of the British Railways Board, was a regular user of the station.

2018 Improvement Works 
Charlbury and Kingham are two of the stations on the Cotswold Line that had their platforms lengthened to accommodate longer GWR Class 802 units, which are nine carriages long — one carriage longer than the longest trains that previously used the station.

Facilities
Charlbury station is one of the only two-platform stations on the Cotswold Line to have step-free access to both platforms. This has been achieved by installing a long set of ramps from the lower car park to both platforms.

Charlbury is one of the only stations in the area that has a user-operated ticket machine. Kingham and Finstock, the main stations on the either side of Charlbury, do not have such facilities. However, passengers travelling from either of these stations when the ticket office is closed can board the service and buy a ticket on the train.

Services

Great Western Railway operate all services at Charlbury. The typical off-peak service in trains per hour is:
 1 tph to London Paddington

References

External links

Station users' collaborative blog
Station on 1947 OS Map

Railway stations in Oxfordshire
DfT Category E stations
Former Great Western Railway stations
Railway stations in Great Britain opened in 1853
Railway stations served by Great Western Railway
Charlbury
Grade II listed buildings in Oxfordshire
Grade II listed railway stations